Till Monkeys Fly is an album by the Dutch rock band Racoon. It was first released in January 2000.

Track listing
 "Hilarious"
 "By Your Side"
 "Daily News"
 "Smoothly"
 "Impossible"
 "Feel Like Flying"
 "Ice Cream Time"
 "Blue Days"
 "World on a Plate"
 "Rapid Eye Movement"
 "Shooting Star"
 "Particular"

Chart positions

Certifications

References

Racoon (band) albums
2000 albums